The Guldbagge for Best Screenplay is a Swedish film award presented annually by the Swedish Film Institute (SFI) as part of the Guldbagge Awards (Swedish: "Guldbaggen") to screenwriters working in the Swedish motion picture industry.

Winners and nominees 
Each Guldbagge Awards ceremony is listed chronologically below along with the winner of the Guldbagge Award for Best Screenplay and the film associated with the award. Before 1991 the awards did not announce nominees, only winners. In the columns under the winner of each award are the other nominees for best screenplay, which are listed from 1991 and forward.

Notes and references

See also 
 Academy Award for Best Original Screenplay
 Academy Award for Best Adapted Screenplay
 BAFTA Award for Best Screenplay
 Golden Globe Award for Best Screenplay

External links 
  
  
 

Screenplay
Screenwriting awards for film
Screenplay